The Prairie Rose State Games was a multi-sport event for athletes from the U.S. State of North Dakota.  It was part of the State Games of America. The first games were held in Bismarck, North Dakota in 1987, and the last games were held in July 2011.

Sports (as of 2006)
Archery
Baseball
Basketball (Traditional)
Basketball (Shooting contest)
BMX
Bowling
Canoe/Kayak
Cowboy Action Shooting
Curling
Dancing
Darts
Disc Golf
Dodgeball
Drill Team
Eightball Pool
Fishing
Fencing
Golf
High Powered Rifle
Horseshoes
Horse show (English & Western)
In-line Skating
Kite Flying
Mountain Biking
Racewalk
Racquetball
Recreational Bike Ride
Remote Control Aircraft
Rifle Silhouette
Road Cycling
Roadrace
Rugby
Skateboarding
Skate Jam
Skeet Shooting
Soccer
Softball
Swimming/Diving
Tennis
Track & Field (Athletics)
Trap Shooting
Triathlon
Volksmarch
Volleyball
Wrestling

References

External links

1987 establishments in North Dakota
2011 disestablishments in North Dakota
Defunct multi-sport events
Multi-sport events in the United States
Recurring sporting events established in 1987
Sports in North Dakota
Recurring events disestablished in 2011